Nazeni Hovhannisyan (born July 18, 1982) is an Armenian actress, presenter and lecturer at the Yerevan State Institute of Theatre and Cinematography.

Selected filmography
Nazeni Hovhannisyan has appeared in the following movies:
 Nothing Will Stay (2007) 
 The Three Friends (2008) 
 Taxi Eli Lav A (2009) 
 The Killed Pigeon (2009–2010)
 The Diary of the Cross Stealer (2010–2011)
 Ala Bala Nica (2011)
 Garegin Nzhdeh (2013)
  (2019)

Awards and nominations

References 

Armenian film actresses
1982 births
Living people
Actresses from Yerevan